Mission Inn can refer to:

 The Mission Inn Hotel & Spa, a historic landmark hotel in downtown Riverside, California
 Mission Inn Resort & Club, a public golf resort in Howey-in-the-Hills, Florida